The Governor General's Award for French-language poetry or drama was a Canadian literary award that annually recognized one Canadian writer for a work of poetry or drama published in French. It was one of the Governor General's Awards for Literary Merit from 1959 to 1980, after which it was divided into the award for French-language poetry and award for French-language drama. The Governor General's Awards program is administered by the Canada Council for the Arts.

The program was created and inaugurated in 1937, for 1936 publications in two categories, conventionally called the 1936 awards. French-language works were first recognized by the 1959 Governor General's Awards.

1950s

1960s

1970s

1980s

References 

French
French
Awards established in 1959
1959 establishments in Canada
Awards disestablished in the 1980s
1980 disestablishments in Canada
Drama French
French-language literary awards